Malacocephalus is a genus of rattails.

Species
There are currently seven recognized species in this genus:
 Malacocephalus boretzi Sazonov, 1985
 Malacocephalus hawaiiensis C. H. Gilbert, 1905 (Hawaiian softhead grenadier)
 Malacocephalus laevis (R. T. Lowe, 1843) (Softhead grenadier)
 Malacocephalus luzonensis C. H. Gilbert & C. L. Hubbs, 1920
 Malacocephalus nipponensis C. H. Gilbert & C. L. Hubbs, 1916
 Malacocephalus occidentalis Goode & T. H. Bean, 1885 (Western softhead grenadier)
 Malacocephalus okamurai Iwamoto & T. Arai, 1987

References

Macrouridae
Taxa named by Albert Günther